Parunthumpara is a village in the Indian state of Kerala's Idukki District. It is a small scenic location near Wagamon en route to Peerumedu. Parunthumpara is located 6 km from Peermade and 25 km from Thekkady. The Malayalam word parunth means eagle and para means rock. It is called Parunthumpara or "eagle rock" because of a large area around like an eagle.

From here, the Makarajyothi of Sabarimala is visible. The main attractions of Parunthumpara are Suicide Point and Tagor Head (a rock that appears to have the shape of Tagor, an Indian poet's, head). 

The District Tourism Promotion Council plans to develop Parunthumpara as a hill station and as a stopover place for tourists who travel from Kumarakom to Thekkady. There are two main roads through which the domestic and international tourists reach the district — from Nedumbassery to Munnar and from Kumarakom to Thekkady. A project has been submitted to the government for constructing a protective wall and for allotting a parking area so as to prevent the entry of vehicles on the grasslands.

Sabarimala pilgrims visit the area to witness makarajyothi, making it a busy place during the pilgrimage season.

References 

Mountains of the Western Ghats
Mountains of Kerala
Geography of Idukki district